Joyce Marie Beatty (née Birdsong, March 12, 1950) is an American politician serving as the U.S. representative for Ohio's 3rd congressional district since 2013, and as chair of the Congressional Black Caucus from 2021 to 2023. A member of the Democratic Party, Beatty represented the 27th district in the Ohio House of Representatives from 1999 to 2008, serving for a time as minority leader. She was also previously the senior vice-president for outreach and engagement at Ohio State University.

In 2012, Beatty ran in the newly redrawn Ohio's 3rd congressional district, based in Columbus, and won the Democratic primary, defeating former U.S. Representative Mary Jo Kilroy. She went on to defeat Republican Chris Long in the general election. Beatty was married to Otto Beatty Jr., who was also a former Ohio state representative.

Early life, family, education, and early political career
Beatty was born on March 12, 1950, in Dayton, Ohio. She has a B.A. in speech from Central State University, an M.S. in counseling psychology from Wright State University in 1975, and has studied at the doctoral level at the University of Cincinnati. Beatty served as the Montgomery County Health and Human Services Director responsible for administering the county's health levy and area public nursing homes, including Stillwater Nursing Home. In 2003, she received an honorary doctorate from the Ohio Dominican University. Beatty served as a delegate for John Kerry on the Ohio delegation to the 2004 Democratic National Convention in Boston.

Beatty was married to attorney and former State Representative Otto Beatty Jr. She has been a national spokesperson for the American Heart Association. She served on the Columbus American Heart Association Board, Ohio Democratic Committee, Women's Fund, NAACP, and Delta Sigma Theta sorority. In addition, she was a legislative chair of The Links and a chair of the Columbus Urban League Board. She won the 2002 YWCA Woman of Achievement Award, the Ohio Health Speaking of Women Health Award, NAACP Freedom Award, Woman of Courage Award, and the Urban League Leadership Recognition Award, and the Dayton NAACP 2019 Leadership Award.

Ohio House of Representatives (1999–2009)

Elections
In 1999, longtime State Representative Otto Beatty Jr. of Ohio's 21st House district decided to resign early to begin an opportunity in the private sector.  His wife, Joyce Beatty, was appointed to his seat. She won a full term in 2000 with 82% of the vote. After redistricting, she decided to run in the newly redrawn Ohio's 27th House district and was reelected in 2002 with 82% of the vote. In 2004, she was reelected to a third term unopposed. In 2006, she was reelected to a fourth term with 87% of the vote. Term limits kept Beatty from seeking another term in 2008.

Tenure
After Chris Redfern left to become chair of the Ohio Democratic Party, Beatty was named minority leader. She served in that capacity during the Ohio 127th General Assembly. She was the first female Democratic House leader in Ohio history.

U.S. House of Representatives

2012 election and tenure

On March 6, 2012, Beatty defeated former Congresswoman Mary Jo Kilroy, Columbus city councilwoman Priscilla Tyson, and state representative Ted Celeste 38%–35%-15%-12% to win the Ohio 3rd congressional district Democratic primary. She received early support from the Ohio Legislative Black Caucus, Columbus Mayor Michael B. Coleman, and various other Central Ohio political figures, including Representative Tracy Maxwell Heard and former Representative W. Carlton Weddington.

Between 2013 and 2020, five of the 88 bills Beatty sponsored became law, all wrapped into broader bills. In 2020, she noted she had "helped to secure" local funding for the revitalization of parts of Dayton and research at Ohio State.

2020 election

Starting in late 2019 and into early 2020, Beatty was campaigning for her fifth term as the representative of Ohio's 3rd congressional district. She faced her first primary challenge since she was elected in 2012, with The Columbus Dispatch writing that the "winner of the Democratic primary almost certainly will go to Washington representing the heavily Democratic district." At the end of 2019, it was reported she had $1.7 million in her campaign account. In February 2020, she was criticized for accepting campaign contributions from financial services PACs while also overseeing the House Financial Services Committee. According to OpenSecrets, at the time, Beatty had raised $5.1 million as a candidate for the U.S. and Ohio Houses, of which $1.5 million was from the finance, insurance and real estate industries. In her defense, she argued she had a "record of grilling bank executives who come before her committee and that much of the money from those PACs came from lower-level employees," and that while Congress needed campaign finance reform, the PAC contributions were "legal under current rules".

In March 2020, The Intercept reported that Beatty and her husband sold one of their Columbus properties in 2013 "to a developer while Otto Beatty sat on the zoning board that approved the sale", leading to accusations of gentrification and "money in politics" by Beatty's political opposition. Beatty called the criticism a "distortion" of her husband's record. Otto Beatty, in an interview with The Dispatch, said his wife had nothing to do with the property's pricing: it had been sold when Otto Beatty was on the Downtown Commission, which "reviewed a request to demolish the existing structures on the property and replace them with a high-rise apartment building". Arguing at the time in favor of demolition and redevelopment, Otto Beatty noted he did not take part in the final vote.

On April 28, 2020, Beatty won the Democratic primary, defeating challenger Morgan Harper, a self-described progressive. Harper, who had been backed by the Sunrise Movement, a group that backed Representative Alexandria Ocasio-Cortez, lost with 32% of the vote to Beatty's 68%. Beatty defeated Republican nominee Mark Richardson with 71% of the vote.

Committee assignments
Committee on Financial Services (113th Congress – present)
Subcommittee on Diversity and Inclusion, Chair
Subcommittee on Housing, Community Development and Insurance
Subcommittee on Oversight and Investigations
Joint Economic Committee (116th Congress – present)

Caucus memberships
 Congressional Black Caucus
Medicare for All Caucus

Compensation
On June 21, 2013, the National Journal published an article, "Nearly One in Five Members of Congress Gets Paid Twice", that reported that Beatty's state pension of $253,323 is the highest, and, combined with her congressional salary, was greater than President Obama's total government compensation.

Arrest 
On July 15, 2021, Beatty was one of nine protesters the United States Capitol Police arrested for illegally demonstrating in the Hart Senate Office Building. She and approximately 20 other voting rights protesters sought to push the Senate to support the For the People and John Lewis Voting Rights Acts. After multiple warnings from the police, Beatty was arrested for violating a Washington, D.C. law against "crowding, obstructing, or incommoding".

Political positions

Defense
Beatty voted for a defense bill that included $1.3 billion for fencing at the US-Mexico border.

Environment
Beatty supports "parts of" the Green New Deal.

Abortion

Beatty is pro-choice.

Cannabis

At one point, Beatty opposed legalizing cannabis for recreational use, but in December 2020, she voted for the Marijuana Opportunity, Reinvestment, and Expungement (MORE) Act (HR 3884), which would remove cannabis from the federal Controlled Substances Act, provide a pathway for expungements and resentencing for marijuana convictions, and create a community reinvestment fund to help create an equitable cannabis industry.

Economy

Beatty opposes decreasing corporate taxes to support economic growth.

Health care

Beatty supported Obamacare and opposed its repeal. In 2019, she introduced the End Price Gouging For Insulin Act bill, which would lower insulin prices nationwide. Beatty's father was diabetic, as was her husband. She has supported efforts in Ohio by Hearcel Craig and Beth Liston to regulate insulin prices. In 2019 she supported "some of" the "health-care fixes that focus on smaller changes to Obamacare rather than a complete overhaul of the system." In March 2020, she voted with a majority of U.S. representatives for a $8.3 billion bill to combat COVID-19.

Impeachment

Beatty supported both the first and second impeachments of Donald Trump.

See also
List of African-American United States representatives
Women in the United States House of Representatives

References

External links 

Congresswoman Joyce Beatty official U.S. House website
Joyce Beatty for Congress

 

|-

|-

20th-century African-American politicians
20th-century African-American women
20th-century American politicians
20th-century American women politicians
21st-century African-American politicians
21st-century African-American women
21st-century American politicians
21st-century American women politicians
1950 births
African-American members of the United States House of Representatives
African-American state legislators in Ohio
African-American women in politics
Central State University alumni
Delta Sigma Theta members
Democratic Party members of the Ohio House of Representatives
Democratic Party members of the United States House of Representatives from Ohio
Female members of the United States House of Representatives
Living people
Members of The Links
Politicians from Columbus, Ohio
Women state legislators in Ohio
Wright State University alumni